
Gmina Miłakowo is an urban-rural gmina (administrative district) in Ostróda County, Warmian-Masurian Voivodeship, in northern Poland.

Villages
Apart from the town of Miłakowo, Gmina Miłakowo contains the villages and settlements of Bieniasze, Boguchwały, Gilginie, Głodówko, Gudniki, Henrykowo, Kłodzin, Klugajny, Książnik, Miejski Dwór, Mysłaki, Naryjski Młyn, Niegławki, Nowe Mieczysławy, Pityny, Pojezierce, Polkajny, Ponary, Raciszewo, Roje, Różnowo, Rycerzewo, Sąglewo, Stare Bolity, Trokajny, Warkałki, Warkały, Warny and Wojciechy.

Neighbouring gminas
Gmina Miłakowo is bordered by the gminas of Godkowo, Lubomino, Morąg, Orneta and Świątki.

References
Polish official population figures 2006

Milakowo
Ostróda County